The 2016–17 Copa Catalunya was the 28th staging of the Copa Catalunya. The competition began on 30 July 2016 and was played by teams in Segunda División, Segunda División B, Tercera División and the top teams of Primera Catalana.

Qualified teams
The following teams compete in the 2016–17 Copa Catalunya.

3 teams of 2015–16 Segunda División

Gimnàstic
Girona
Llagostera

9 teams of 2015–16 Segunda División B

Reus Deportiu
Lleida Esportiu
Cornellà
Sabadell
Barcelona B
Espanyol B
'Badalona
L'Hospitalet
Olot

16 teams of 2015–16 Tercera División

Prat
Gavà
Europa
Vilafranca
Montañesa
Sant Andreu
Cerdanyola
Júpiter
Figueres
Ascó
Palamós
Terrassa
Manlleu
Santfeliuenc
Granollers
Masnou

2 teams of 2015–16 Primera Catalana

Castelldefels
Vilassar de Mar

Tournament

First round

Bye: Olot

Second round

Third round

Bye: Prat

Fourth round

Bye: Badalona

Semifinals

Final

External links
2016–17 results
Federació Catalana de Futbol 

Cata
Copa Catalunya seasons
Copa